"(It's All Down to) Goodnight Vienna" is a song written by John Lennon, and released by Ringo Starr as the opening title track to his 1974 album Goodnight Vienna. A brief reprise (in which Ringo thanks the band and addresses the listener) closes the album. Released as the third single, this version is a medley combination of the two. The single was released in the US on 2 June 1975.

The title song features Lennon on opening count-in and piano, and Billy Preston on clavinet; and the reprise features Lennon's intro, 'OK, with gusto, boys, with gusto!'.

Composition and Lyrics

Written during Lennon's so-called "Lost Weekend" with May Pang, the lyrics depict the pair hanging out with cohorts (including Starr, Harry Nilsson and Keith Moon) in Los Angeles. The term "Goodnight Vienna" is English slang meaning "it's all over", and the slang term "bohunk" is a mildly derogatory term for an immigrant of Bohemian descent.

This was the second of five Lennon songs to be offered for inclusion on Starr's solo albums, (the others being "I'm the Greatest" from Ringo, "Cookin' (in the Kitchen of Love)" from Ringo's Rotogravure, and two unreleased songs intended for Stop and Smell the Roses).

Personnel 

 Ringo Starr - lead vocals, drums
 John Lennon - piano
 Klaus Voormann - bass
 Jim Keltner - drums
 Lon Van Eaton - guitar
 Jesse Ed Davis - guitar
 Billy Preston - clavinet
 Carl Fortina - accordion

Reception
Billboard called "(It's All Down to) Goodnight Vienna" a "good, upbeat sing-along type song," saying that the lyrics were "fun" and the instrumentals were "strong." Record World said that "Recalling his more rock 'n rollin' hits of the past, this John Lennon tune should give Ringo his third straight top 10 from [Goodnight Vienna]."

Billboard also reviewed the B-side of the single, "Oo-Wee", calling it a "strong, rhythm oriented song...with some good horn riffs and an interesting piano solo."  Cash Box called "Oo-Wee" "equally strong for programming" as "(It's All Down to) Goodnight Vienna."

Chart history

References
 Footnotes

 Citations

Ringo Starr songs
Apple Records singles
1975 singles
Songs written by John Lennon
Song recordings produced by Richard Perry
1974 songs